Turkey competed at the 2009 Summer Universiade in Belgrade, Serbia from 1 July to 12 July 2009. A total of 88 athletes were a part of the Turkish team.

Turkey won nine medals (23rd place), including two gold, two silver and five bronze medals.

Medal table

Athletics

Men's

Women's

Judo

Women's

Taekwondo

Men's

Women's

References

Nations at the 2009 Summer Universiade
Summer Universiade
2009